Brew (foaled 1994 in New Zealand) is a small, plain bay Thoroughbred gelding who won the 2000 Melbourne Cup for trainer Mike Moroney and jockey Kerrin McEvoy. Brew's first stakes win was the Listed Japan Trophy at 2559 metres on Turnbull Stakes day. This race is now called The Bart Cummings and is run at Group 3 level. Brew carried the lightweight of 49 kilos and defeated the veteran Yippyio and the stablemate Second Coming in the Melbourne Cup.  After finishing second to Yippyio in the Moonee Valley Cup, Brew qualified for the Melbourne Cup by winning The Group 2 Saab Quality at 2500 metres on Derby Day, three days before the Cup. When winning the Saab Quality, Brew achieved a Timeform rating of 113.  Brew is a son of Sir Tristram and the champion New Zealand racemare and Japan Cup winner Horlicks but was gelded before showing his best form.  The Melbourne Cup was Brew's last win. In the Melbourne Cup, Brew achieved a career peak Timeform rating of 114. Brew also ran in the previous Melbourne Cup in 1999 which was won by
Rogan Josh
A little known fact: Some time after winning the Melbourne Cup, Brew was spelled from racing and trained for duty as a police horse in Melbourne. He returned to racing but never found his previous form.
Brew is now at Living Legends, the International Home of Rest for Champion Horses located in Woodlands Historic Park, Greenvale, Victoria, Australia.

Pedigree

See also

 List of millionaire racehorses in Australia
 List of Melbourne Cup winners

Reference list

 Brew's racing record

External links
 Brew's pedigree and racing stats

1994 racehorse births
Racehorses bred in New Zealand
Racehorses trained in Australia
Melbourne Cup winners
Thoroughbred family 10-d